Ilias Alhaft (born 23 February 1997) is a Dutch professional footballer who plays for Almere City, as a forward.

Career
Alhaft made his professional football debut for Sparta Rotterdam on 29 April 2016, in the 2–3 home win over FC Dordrecht. He came on as a substitute for Loris Brogno in the 85th minute. In the 2016–17 season, he also played in the second-tier Eerste Divisie with Jong Sparta, the reserve team. His contract was terminated in January 2019 and he continued his career at Almere City FC.

Personal life
Born in the Netherlands, Alhaft is of Moroccan descent.

Honours
Sparta Rotterdam
 Eerste Divisie: 2015–16

References

External links
 
 Ilias Alhaft at Kicker

1997 births
Living people
Dutch footballers
Dutch sportspeople of Moroccan descent
Sparta Rotterdam players
Almere City FC players
Eredivisie players
Eerste Divisie players
Tweede Divisie players
Association football forwards
Footballers from Rotterdam